ING Cup was a pre-Olympics football tournament held at Hong Kong Stadium, Hong Kong from 30 July to 2 August 2008. The Netherlands, Cameroon, United States and Ivory Coast competed for the ING Cup as part of their teams' final preparation for the 2008 Beijing Olympic Games.

Background
The ING Cup was hosted by the Hong Kong Football Association and organised by the Asian Football Confederation's (AFC) marketing partner World Sport Group (WSG).

Format
Since the Netherlands and the United States were in the same group in the Olympic football tournament, they did not face each other in the ING Cup. Therefore, the winner of the ING Cup was be determined by the number of points gained from the matches played.

The point system was different from the regular football scoring system. A win earned 3 points, but a point was awarded for every goal scored. A draw still earned one point, and a loss did not gain or lose points.

Match Day 1

Match Day 2

Points table

Goalscorers
The goal scorers from the ING Cup are as follows:

Live Broadcast
TV Broadcast: TVB Pearl

References
 US and Ivory Coast draw 0-0 in Olympic warm-up.
 Late goals give Holland 2-0 win over Cameroon.

External links
 ING Cup English website

2008
2008–09 in Hong Kong football
2008–09 in Dutch football
2008 in Ivorian football
2008 in American soccer
2008 in Cameroonian football